Félix Auger-Aliassime was the defending champion and successfully defended his title.

Auger-Aliassime won the title after defeating Johan Tatlot 6–7(3–7), 7–5, 6–2 in the final.

Seeds

Draw

Finals

Top half

Bottom half

References
Main Draw
Qualifying Draw

Open Sopra Steria de Lyon - Singles
2018 Singles